
Year 19 BC was either a common year starting on Thursday, Friday or Saturday or a leap year starting on Thursday or Friday (link will display the full calendar) of the Julian calendar (the sources differ, see leap year error for further information) and a common year starting on Wednesday of the Proleptic Julian calendar. At the time, it was known as the Year of the Consulship of Saturninus and Vespillo (or, less frequently, year 735 Ab urbe condita). The denomination 19 BC for this year has been used since the early medieval period, when the Anno Domini calendar era became the main method in Europe for naming years.

Events

By place

Roman Empire 
 The Aeneid by the Roman poet Virgil is published. The Aeneid is an epic poem in 12 books that tells the story of the foundation of Rome from the ashes of Troy.
 In Rome, Lucius Cornelius Balbus receives the honor of a triumph on the Forum Romanum, for his victories over the Garamantes in Africa.
 The Cantabrians, living on the northernmost coast of Spain, are brought under Roman control. The region is completely subdued until 16 BC.

Asia 
 King Yuri becomes ruler of the Korean kingdom of Goguryeo.

Births 
 Vipsania Julia Agrippina, daughter of Marcus Vipsanius Agrippa and Julia the Elder

Deaths 
 September 21 – Virgil, Roman poet (b. 70 BC)
 Albius Tibullus, Roman poet (b. 54 BC)
 Dongmyeong, Korean king of Goguryeo

References